The Gardiner Street Gospel Choir is a Gospel music choir based in the Jesuit Saint Francis Xavier Church on Gardiner Street in Dublin, Ireland. The award-winning choir is made up of volunteers who perform at services, and on other stages around Ireland.

History
The choir was founded in 2000 by Trinity College music graduate Kevin Kelly and Edmond Grace SJ. Beginning with a smaller group, as of 2011, there were 40 voices backed by 8 musicians. As of 2020, the musical director was Cathy McEvoy.

Over the years, the group have played in a number of venues, including Vicar Street, the National Concert Hall, the Olympia Theatre, the Phoenix Park, at the Dublin City Soul Festival, at the women's prison, the Dóchas Centre, and for the Dublin Docklands Authority. In May 2008, the choir performed at Irish Aid's 'Africa Day' in Dublin Castle, where they collaborated with Kíla.

Recordings and prizes
The choir is accompanied by some instruments, including keyboard, guitar, percussion and brass. The music played includes gospel and contemporary, including pieces by U2 and Bob Marley as well as traditional gospel.

In 2002, Gardiner Street Gospel Choir made radio and television appearances and launched a CD named One Love. This CD was recorded live at a concert in the O'Reilly Hall, at Belvedere College, Dublin.

Twice since its foundation, the choir has won the top Gospel Choir prize at the annual Festival of the Association of Irish Musical Societies (AIMS). They subsequently won the Gospel Choir competition at the AIMS choral festival in New Ross.

In 2003, Luka Bloom performed with the choir, and the choir provided backing vocals for two tracks on his Eleven Songs album. They were recorded in the Ignatian Room, at the back of Gardiner Street Church.

The choir have recorded with Juliet Turner, and also sang live on RTÉ's "In Concert" series, and the group has appeared on Channel 4 television.

See also
Saint Francis Xavier Church, Dublin

References

External links
Gardiner Street Gospel Choir’s Official Website

Gospel music groups
Irish choirs
Musical groups established in 2000